Gay Mitchell (born 1948 in Dunmore, County Galway) is an Irish former sportsperson.  He played Gaelic football with his local club Dunmore McHales and was a member of the Galway senior inter-county team in the 1970s.

References

 

1948 births
Living people
Dunmore McHales Gaelic footballers
Galway inter-county Gaelic footballers
Connacht inter-provincial Gaelic footballers
Gaelic football goalkeepers